African Americans Irving "Ervie" Arthur (1903–1920) and his brother Herman Arthur (1892–1920), a World War I veteran, were lynched—burned alive—at the Lamar County Fairgrounds in Paris, Texas, on July 6, 1920. The event extended and amplified regional and national flashpoints for  It happened just a year after the racial violence of 1919's Red Summer. The family was attacked by some of the town's white population and were forced to flee to the north, mostly settling in Chicago. This and other attacks on Black Americans encouraged civil rights groups to fight against lynchings in America. Media outlets reported on the 100-year-old anniversary but the memorial events were scaled down due to the COVID-19 pandemic.

Background 

The Arthur brothers (né Charles)—stepsons of Scott Arthur, a sharecropper tenant of the Hodges' farm—were accused of fatally shooting, on July 2, 1920, the landlord, John Henry Hodges (1859–1920) and his son, William M. Hodges (1886–1920), during a  William Hodges' death certificate indicates that he died of both a knife and gunshot wound. The prevailing story was that the Arthurs refused Hodges' demand to work beyond noon Saturdays and full-Sundays—to pay a 

This account was chronicled in a letter from a Paris citizen, who requested anonymity, to James Weldon Johnson, Acting Secretary of the NAACP, who, in turn, forwarded it for publishing in newspapers that included the New York Age and Negro World. The letter explained that, (paraphrasing) against the usual custom in Paris, Hodges compelled the Arthurs to work all day Saturday, which they did for a period; and, on Sundays, they washed and ironed their clothes. Sometime during the summer of 1920, the Arthurs refused to work past noon Saturdays and all-day Sunday. As a result John Hodges and his son, Will, went to their home on June 29, 1920, and took their dinner off the stove and threw it into the yard, then kicked their stove and furniture into the yard. During this time, Will Hodges held a gun on the Arthurs. He also compelled the boys to pull off their shoes and clothes and their sisters to pull off their dresses and give them to him, claiming that they were in debt to him. When the Arthurs attempted to move from the farm, permanently, three days later, the Hodges appeared again, this time fired a gun towards the family as they were packing a borrowed truck. One of the Arthur sons slipped into the house, retrieved a gun, and returned fire, killing John and Will Hodges.

With a tip from "Pitt" McGrew (née James McGrew; 1875–1943), Herman and Ervie Arthur were arrested the morning of July 6, 1920, in Valliant, Oklahoma, by McCurtain County Deputy Sheriff Weaver and the City Marshall of Valliant, who brought them to Hugo, and at about noon, placed them in the Choctaw County Jail. At about 1:45 , the captors left with their prisoners for the Lamar County jail in Paris. When they reached the Red River, about fifteen automobiles were waiting at the south bank, but no one attempted to take the prisoners. They reached their destination at 3 . McGrew, who was African American, has been chronicled as notorious and disliked by the African American community.

Notice of Herman and Ervie Arthur's impending lynching was openly advertised, to wit: "Niggers caught. Black brutes who killed Hodges will be burned in the fair grounds. Be on  Shortly after their arrival, several hundred men approached the jail with a pinch bar and the leaders battered the outer door. The jailer and two guards, all heavily armed, were inside the jail. After some "parlaying," the jailer proposed that if twelve of the mob came forward as a committee, he would surrender the keys.  At 7:30 , July 6, 1920, twelve men took Herman and Ervie Arthur from the jail and dragged them out to North Main, to the fairgrounds. At 8:00 , the Arthur brothers were burned alive at the fairground in Paris while a mob of 3,000 watched. 

According to the NAACP letter, members of the mob dragged the charred remains behind an automobile for hours through the streets of an African-American neighborhood—up West Sherman Street and down 7th Street SW, between Sherman and Washington Streets, past Will Hodges' residence—while screaming, "Here are the barbecued Niggers, all you Niggers come out and see them and take  One witness remembered it as a "regular parade of seventeen cars and a truck, all filled with armed men". According to the Dallas Morning News of July 8, 1920, Pine Bluff Street was "the general dividing line between the two 

Meanwhile, the three sisters—ages 14, 17, and 20—were being held at the Lamar County jail under the pretense of "protection". While the Arthur brothers' remains were being dragged through Paris, the sisters were severely beaten  taken to the basement, stripped of all their clothing and there, reportedly, raped by 20 white men. After the sexual assault, they were given bacon, molasses, and a sack of flour and told to leave the 

None of the mob members was masked, but, according to a claim by some newspapers, none could be identified due to the 

As was reported by the McCurtain Gazette, July 10, 1920, Ernest Christian Steen (1892–1960), office deputy for Choctow County Sheriff Ben Fitzgerald (né Robert Benjamin Fitgerald; 1886–1967), was present when the Arthurs were burned to death. He said that he was within  of the pyre. He said that he would never again witness such a scene, that it was too terrible.

With respect to the assaults on the three sisters, in 2018, historian Hollie A. Teague wrote, "It is difficult to imagine a scenario in which some of those twenty White men were not jailers, police officers, or sheriff deputies. Indeed, it is impossible to imagine a scenario in which those officials would not at least be aware of the prolonged assault taking place or who was participating in it. Yet, not only was the assault allowed to continue, no arrests were made [immediately] afterward. This stands in stark contrast to the reaction that followed attacks on white women or children".

The next day, July 7, 1920, McCurtain County Sheriff John William DeWitt (1872–1933) of Valliant told the news media that Lamar County Sheriff William Everett "Eb" Clarkson (1875–1945) had confided in him—while in Idabel the night before searching for the those who he thought were the actual killers—that he was sure that one, if not both, of the lynched Arthur brothers would have been found innocent. Clarkson insisted that one of the lynched victims was not the murderer and that the other could not be  There was also a claim that the Arthur brothers likely acted in self-defense following two armed provocations, both by William Hodges (accompanied by his father), who allegedly, during the second incident, fired the first gunshots. Herman Arthur, a World War I  was reportedly a skilled

Ensuing protests, disciplinary actions, and criminal proceedings 
The NAACP sent a telegram to Acting Governor Willard Arnold Johnson (1862–1923) (de) on July 8, 1920, protesting the lynching and urged the Governor to take immediate action to apprehend and punish members of the 

A policeman identified as being part of the mob was dismissed from the Paris Police 

In Paris, Sixth Judicial District Court Judge Ben H. Denton (né Benjamin Harrison Denton; 1854–1940) ordered a special grand jury to investigate the burning of the Arthur brothers. On July 26, 1920, the jury returned five bills of indictment, all for first degree murder. Those indicted were:

On October 30, 1920, Judge Denton ordered the cases of the five defendants to be transferred to Fifty-Ninth District Court at Sherman, under Judge Silas Hare (1862—1931), son of late State Representative Silas Hare (1827–1908). All were acquitted.

In the case of the State v. Tom Dobbs, Judge Hare, on January 14, 1922, instructed a jury to acquit Dobbs on the grounds that the State failed to connect the defendant to the crime.

In the case of the State v. Ernest Coggins, the case was "passed" January 11, 1922, when called by the Fifty-Ninth District Court in Sherman—Judge Frank Edward Wilcox (1865–1938), presiding—due to defense counsel's claim that Coggins was ill at home in Paris. "Passed" meant that the case was called and nothing  A passed case is not a dismissal. Rather, it leaves the court an option to schedule a court hearing, later. Coggins was a World War I veteran—a U.S. Navy —and a fireman for Paris.

"After the bodies had been burned to a crisp" , Wilbur Clough, dressed in khakis, identified himself as being in charge of the U.S. Government Recruiting Office in Paris and climbed halfway up a telephone pole near the one to which the Arthurs had been bound and announced, "We have done what we came here to do. The negroes have been burned to death and we can go to our

Scott and Violet Arthur family photo 

The family photo was arranged by the Chicago Defender, who originally published it September 4, 1920, with the following caption:

Rev. Dr. Lucas (né William W. Lucas; 1865–1926) posed with the family in the photo, but was cropped out (see his arm at the far left). The photo has endured for  years—having been published in government reports, history books, and online; but the Arthur family has rarely been identified.

Red Summer of 1919

The year before the lynching of Irving and Herman Arthur saw several incidents of civil unrest that spiked during the so-called American Red Summer of 1919, with terrorist attacks on black communities and white oppression in over three dozen cities and counties. In most cases, white mobs attacked African American neighborhoods. In some cases, black community groups resisted the attacks, especially in Chicago and Washington, D.C. Most deaths occurred in rural areas during events like the Elaine Race Riot in Arkansas, where an estimated 100 to 240 black people and five white people were killed. Also in 1919 were the Chicago Race Riot and Washington D.C. race riot which killed 38 and 39 people respectively, and with both having many more non-fatal injuries and extensive property damage reaching up into the millions of dollars.

100-year remembrance 
On July 7, 2020, a group of about 20—which included descendants of Scott Arthur (1836–1937) and Violet Arthur (née Charles; 1860–1951), parents of the Arthur brothers, and descendants of the Hodges—while donning face masks and maintaining social distancing for protection against COVID-19, met for the first time in a remembrance ceremony at the Red River Valley Veterans Memorial in Paris.

On the Arthur family side, attendees included Janese Walton-Roberts, grandniece of Herman and Ervie Arthur, and great–granddaughter of Scott and Violet Arthur—by way of Mary Lee Arthur (1905–1977) (her grandmother and one of Herman and Arvie's seven sisters) and Mary Lue Sims (1932–2001) (her mother) (nephew and nieces of Herman and Ervie Arthur). On the Hodges family side, attendees included Melinda Watters, great-granddaughter of Vinckley Meadows Hodges (1881–1948), one of John H. Hodges' five children. The Remembrance was the idea of Watters. The 2020 COVID crisis kept away most Paris residents due to fears of the disease and social distancing restrictions.

Although Walton-Roberts grew up in Chicago she now lives in Killeen, Texas. She was reported as saying, "If anything comes out of this, then it was worth it to go back". Walton-Roberts didn't know of any descendants of the Hodges family until she stumbled across a letter written by a Hodges descendant who apologized for her family's role in the  Walton-Roberts noted, "The city never offered any type of apology ... I appreciate it because her letter was something that needed to happen."

According to the Chicago Tribune, as of 2020 there are three living grandchildren of Scott and Violet Arthur—by way of their mother, Mary Lee Arthur: Rufus Arthur Sims, of Chicago's West Side; Dorothy Williams, of Country Club Hills, a Chicago suburb, and Annie Violet Sims, of Atlanta. None of the three were able to attend. But Rufus, reflecting on the 100-year remembrance, expressed to the Chicago Tribune that the story harbored over the years by his family has been particularly painful. Rufus, though, was pleased that it was being told—the remembrance was momentous. "It was a beautiful thing to bring everything out, especially with the way things are going [in America] at this particular time", said Rufus. "My uncles were burned up, burned alive in a field because they fought back. A lot of people lost their lives for fighting back. It's important for the younger generation to understand that".

Paris has been the site of 12 documented lynchings since 1892. The Arthur brothers were the last.

National memorial 

Featured among other things, is a sculpture by Kwame Akoto-Bamfo of a mother with a chain around her neck and an infant in her arms. On a hill overlooking the sculpture is the Memorial Corridor which displays 805 hanging steel rectangles, each representing the counties in the United States where a documented lynching took place and, for each county, the names of those lynched. For Lamar County, Irving and Herman Arthur are memorialized as lynching victims.

Herman Arthur's service in the U.S. Armed Forces 
During World War I, Herman Arthur enlisted in the U.S. Army. He was inducted April 29, 1918, at Mount Pleasant, Texas, and trained for a little over a month with the  Company,  Battalion,  Depot Brigade at Camp Travis—a World War I training camp in San Antonio that existed from 1917 to 1924, then was absorbed by Fort Sam Houston. (see Camp Travis photos at Wikimedia Commons) On July 14, 1918, Arthur was transferred to the Army Corps of Engineers and attached to Company A (about 224 men),  Engineers Service Battalion an all-African American unit that mobilized at Camp Travis. The  was one of 53 Engineers Service Battalions (Nos. 505 thru 567, with some gaps) composed entirely of African Americans. Each Battalion had about 1008 men.

On July 15, the  Engineers Service Battalion—(i) Field and Staff, (ii) Headquarters Detachment, (iii) Medical Detachment, and (iv) Companies A thru D; 878 total personnel—departed from the Army's Hoboken Port of Embarkation aboard the USS Great Northern to Brest, France, to serve on the Western Front of the European theatre as part of the American Expeditionary Forces. The Battalion's mission was: "Service of supply, general construction to September 17, 1918; then  Army on road and miscellaneous duties."

Although the Armistice of November 11, 1918, took effect at 11 , Company A, and the entire 537, remained in Europe. On June 28, 1919, Company A, with Private Arthur, departed Brest, France, aboard the USS Mount Vernon and arrived in the Hoboken Port of Embarkation, July 5, 1919—a year and one day before being burned alive with his younger brother. Capt. Willis Dhu Aine Peaslee (1887–1960), an electrical engineer and graduate of Stanford, was the Commander of Company A.

See also

 Lynching of Henry Smith, Paris, Texas (February 1, 1893)
 Longview race riot, Texas (July 10–12, 1919)
 Port Arthur Race Riot, Texas (July 15, 1919)
 Lynching of Chilton Jennings in Gilmer, Texas (July 24, 1919)
 Texarkana, Texas, race riot of 1919 (August 6, 1919)
 African-American veterans lynched after World War I
 Anti-lynching movement
 Hate crime laws in the United States
 Jessie Daniel Ames (1883–1972), Texas anti-lynching activist
 Extrajudicial and retribution killing

Further reading

Laws, advocacy, and public policy

Federal laws 
 United States Bill of Rights, ratified December 15, 1791
 Fifth Amendment to the United States Constitution, ratified December 15, 1791, as part of the Bill of Rights (see Due Process Clause)
 Sixth Amendment to the United States Constitution, the right to a fair trial
 Eighth Amendment to the United States Constitution, prohibits the Federal government from imposing excessive bail, excessive fines, or cruel and unusual punishments.
 Fourteenth Amendment to the United States Constitution, one of three Reconstruction Amendments, adopted July 9, 1868 (exactly  months after the end of the Civil War), among other things, extended the right of due process to all states (for all citizens) (see Due Process Clause)
 Incorporation Doctrine is a Constitutional doctrine that makes the Bill of Rights applicable to the States under the due process clause of the Fourteenth Amendment. Prior to the Doctrine (and the Fourteenth Amendment, adopted July 9, 1868), the Bill of Rights applied only to the Federal Government and to Federal Court cases.  After passage of the Fourteenth Amendment, the Supreme Court favored a process called "selective incorporation," under which, the Supreme Court would incorporate certain parts of Amendments One thru Ten. The Sixth Amendment was fully incorporated, except for the right to a jury.
 Civil Rights Act of 1866
 Fourteenth Amendment to the United States Constitution
 Torture Victim Protection Act of 1991

State law 
 Article I (the Texas Bill of Rights), Section 13 of the Texas Constitution, adopted February 15, 1876 – Excessive bail shall not be required, nor excessive fines imposed, nor cruel or unusual punishment inflicted. All courts shall be open, and every person for an injury done him in his lands, goods, person or reputation shall have remedy by due course of law. (link)

Attempted and pending anti-lynching Federal legislation 
 1918: The Dyer Anti-Lynching Bill, named for Leonidas C. Dyer who introduced it in the U.S. House of Representatives in 1918, failed.
 2018: The Justice for Victims of Lynching Act, passed the by the U.S. Senate unanimously December 19, 2018, but failed passage by the House before the 115th Congress ended on January 3, 2019.
 2020: The Emmett Till Antilynching Act, which would make lynching a federal hate crime, was passed by the U.S. House of Representatives February 26, 2020. The vote was 410 to 4. U.S. Representative Louie Gohmert—born and raised in Camp County, resident of Tyler, and whose congressional district includes Tyler—was one of the four who voted against the Act. Gohmert cited his preference for the death penalty under Texas law, under which two convicted white supremacists were executed for the 1998 murder of James Byrd, Jr., in Jasper, Texas. In a criticism of Gohmert's vote, former Tyler City Councilman Pastor Ralph Edward Caraway said, "After over 400 lynchings in Texas from 1885 to 1942, we should be at the point where lynching is universally condemned in our society." Gohmert has served as Assistant District Attorney for Titus, Morris, and Camp Counties, Texas. Herman Arthur was born in Pittsburg, Texas (Camp County). The Scott Arthur family, including stepsons Herman and Ervie, lived in Camp County in 1900—–and in Titus County in 1910. A son-in-law of Scott Arthur, Hardy Turner (born 1875), was born in Morris County.  As for Gohmert's advocacy of the death penalty, sociologists James Walter Marquart, PhD, Jonathan Roger Sorensen, PhD, and Sheldon Ekland-Olson, PhD, in their 1993 book, The Rope, the Chair, and the Needle: Capital Punishment in Texas, 1923–1990, lay out a history of racist vagaries in the East Texas region's vigorous support for capital punishment throughout the 20th century.

Bibliography

Annotations

Notes

References 
News media

 
 
 
 
 
 

 
 
 
 

 
 
 
 

 
 

 
 

 

 
 
 
 
 
 

 

  
 
 
  

Books, journals, magazines, and papers

  

  – Total pages: 270 

  Teague, Hollie A. (July 5, 2018). 

 

 

Government and genealogical archives

Furthur reading 
 Timuel D. Black, Jr., Papers (re: Timuel Black), Chicago Public Library, Box 188, Folder 4, Black History – "Arthur Family." (1998); 

African-American history between emancipation and the civil rights movement
White American riots in the United States
1920 riots in the United States
Racially motivated violence against African Americans
History of racism in Texas
1920 in Texas
July 1920 events
African-American history of Texas
Riots and civil disorder in Texas
Lynching deaths in Texas
1920 murders in the United States
People murdered in Texas
Prisoners murdered in custody
Anti-black racism in the United States
Lamar County, Texas
Crimes in Texas
Murdered African-American people
Deaths from fire in the United States
People or corpses dragged behind a vehicle
Gang rape in the United States